Damien Peter O'Connor (born 16 January 1958) is a New Zealand Labour Party politician who currently serves as Minister of Agriculture, Minister for Biosecurity, Minister for Trade and Export Growth, Minister for Land Information and Minister for Rural Communities in the Sixth Labour Government. He previously served as a cabinet minister in the Fifth Labour Government. He has been a member of Parliament since 1993 and currently represents the West Coast-Tasman electorate.

Early years
O'Connor was born in Westport in 1958. He attended primary school in his home town before going on to St Bede's College, Christchurch, a Roman Catholic school, and Lincoln University.

Before becoming an MP, he worked in a variety of jobs in farming and tourism. During a five-year stint in Australia, he worked as a machinery operator and in sales. On his return to New Zealand he established Buller Adventure Tours, an adventure tourism company, which he owned and operated in a partnership.

Member of Parliament

Fourth National Government, 1993–1999
He was first elected to Parliament in the 1993 election, recapturing the West Coast seat for Labour after the upset victory of National's Margaret Moir in the 1990 election.

When Helen Clark successfully challenged Mike Moore for the party leadership after the election, O'Connor supported Moore. Later, he said in 2018 that this had set his career back. Unlike other MPs who entered Parliament in 1993, O'Connor was not named a minister in Clark's first ministry in 1999. He was, however, appointed as chair of the Primary Production select committee.

He won the reconfigured West Coast-Tasman seat in the 1996 election, and was the MP for the electorate until he lost it to National's Chris Auchinvole during the 2008 election.

Fifth Labour Government, 1999–2008
After the 2002 election he was appointed an associate minister in four portfolios: agriculture, health, racing and rural affairs. He succeeded Annette King as Minister for Racing in a 2003 reshuffle.

After the 2005 election, in what would become the final term of the Fifth Labour Government, O'Connor was promoted to be Minister of Corrections and Minister of Tourism. He lost the Corrections role in 2007, following calls for his resignation over the previous year over the murder of Liam Ashley in a prison van and a scandal where he was found to have brought a suspended prison officer on a parliamentary rugby tour.

Fifth National Government, 2008–2017
At the 2008 general election, the Labour government was defeated by the National Party and O'Connor lost the West-Coast Tasman electorate to National Party list MP Chris Auchinvole by 971 votes. At this election O'Connor also stood as a list candidate for the first time since 1996; however, his position of 37 was too low for him to return to Parliament as a Labour Party list MP immediately. O'Connor eventually returned to Parliament after the retirement of former deputy leader Michael Cullen in May 2009. He retook West-Coast Tasman for Labour in 2011 and has held the seat since, defending challenges from former Westland District Mayor Maureen Pugh in 2014 and 2017.

In Opposition between 2009 and 2017, O'Connor held various spokesperson roles including agriculture, biosecurity, fisheries, food safety, primary industries and rural affairs.

Sixth Labour Government, 2017–present
When the Labour Party formed a coalition government with New Zealand First in 2017, O'Connor was appointed Minister of Agriculture, Minister for Biosecurity, Minister for Food Safety, Minister for Rural Communities and Associate Minister (later Minister of State) for Trade and Export Growth. An early challenge for O'Connor in the Agriculture portfolio was managing the 2017 Mycoplasma bovis outbreak, opting to attempt eradication to save the projected $1.3 billion cost in lost production to the industry over 10 years, with ongoing productivity losses across the farming sector. On Agriculture, O'Connor has said there is a new “collective wisdom through generational change in farming, which means we are more closely aligned than some on the fringes wish to portray’’.

During the 2020 general election, O'Connor was re-elected in West Coast-Tasman by a final margin of 6,208 votes, defeating National's candidate Maureen Pugh. In early November 2020, O'Connor maintained his Agriculture, Biosecurity, and Rural Communities ministerial portfolios while becoming the lead Minister for Trade and Export Growth and assuming the Land Information ministerial portfolio.

O'Connor has led various trade negotiations across the world in his role as Minister for Trade and Export Growth, including an historic $1.8 Billion EU Free Trade Agreement in 2022. O'Connor was the Facilitator of the Fishing Subsidy negotiations at the 12th World Trade Organisation Conference and delivered an agreement with new rules barring countries from subsidising illegal, unreported, and unregulated fishing.

At the 2022 Asia-Pacific Economic Co-operation (APEC) forum ministers’ meeting, O'Connor joined a staged walkout when the Russian Minister spoke, with the shared statement including “We condemn in the strongest terms, the unprovoked war of aggression by Russia against Ukraine."

In late January 2021, O'Connor drew media attention when he stated during an interview with CNBC's Asia Squawk Box "Australia "should follow us [New Zealand] and show respect to China." His comments came at a time of heightened Australian-China tensions relating to Australian legislation targeting foreign investment and Chinese trade sanctions against Australia. O'Connor's remarks were criticised as unhelpful to Australia and "at odds with reality" by Liberal MP Dave Sharma. While the Chinese state-owned newspaper Global Times praised Wellington's perceived openness towards Beijing, O'Connor's remarks were criticised by Victoria University of Wellington academic Robert Ayson, International Service for Human Rights director Phil Lynch and Human Rights Watch director Elaine Person for implying that New Zealand was prioritising trade with China over human rights. O'Connor has since said it is important New Zealand does not send ministers to the Beijing Winter Olympic Games, stating "we've been very strong on those issues around human rights and unnecessary discrimination. We should continue to do that."

Political views 
O'Connor is regarded as an "economic dry" on the right of the Labour Party. His approach to life and politics in New Zealand is very “upfront and honest’’.

In April 2011 O'Connor attracted criticism from Labour Party leader Phil Goff after describing the list MP selection process as being run by "self-serving unionists and a gaggle of gays." O'Connor was disappointed the system did not deliver better results for rural and provincial candidates, such as himself, who were outside the party's power blocs, and apologised for his comments. He is a staunch advocate for the rural and provincial people with strong family ties to the Labour Party's establishment.

He has stated that the “timing and decisions’’ on some of Parliament’s conscience votes may have portrayed him as something else, but that’s “a long way from the truth’’. In 2012, he was one of four Labour MPs who voted against the Marriage Amendment Bill, which permitted same sex marriage in New Zealand. He has since attended the Pride Parade in London with his daughter who, in 2012, publicly challenged him on his vote stating "Why should they be denied the same human right everyone else is entitled to just because they love someone the same sex?"

In 2014, O'Connor voted with the governing National Party (and against the Labour Party) to support the West Coast Windblown Timber Bill, which allowed the Government to recover storm-blow timber on the West Coast following Cyclone Ita.

O'Connor does not oppose euthanasia, but has voted cautiously on the matter to ensure legislation is strong enough to protect society's most vulnerable. He voted against Michael Laws' Death with Dignity Bill in 1995, Peter Brown's Death with Dignity Bill in 2003 and David Seymour's End of Life Choice Bill in 2019. He also opposed the Abortion Legislation Bill in 2020, but voted in favour in its first reading. He has since stated he "absolutely do[es] support New Zealand's laws on abortion" and, relating to the overturning of Roe v Wade in the United States, said "what we see coming from the US is clearly disturbing and shocking". O'Connor has stated he believes in a woman's right to choose without judgement, but believed the bill required a "technical protection" for the premises of gender or disability.

Business activities
O'Connor is past president of the Buller Promotion Association, a member of the West Coast Tourism Development Group, a member of the West Coast Business Development Board and a founding director of Buller Community Development Company. He also won West Coast Young Farmer of the Year.

Personal life 
O'Connor separated from his wife Vicky after twelve years of marriage in 2004. The couple had four children. He has a daughter with his new partner, Sharon Flood. Labour Party MP for Ōhāriu and former Police Association president Greg O'Connor is his cousin.

Notes

References

External links
 Parliamentary website page

|-

|-

|-

|-

|-

|-

|-

|-

|-

1958 births
Living people
New Zealand people of Irish descent
New Zealand Labour Party MPs
Members of the Cabinet of New Zealand
People from Westport, New Zealand
Place of birth missing (living people)
New Zealand list MPs
New Zealand MPs for South Island electorates
Lincoln University (New Zealand) alumni
People educated at St Bede's College, Christchurch
Members of the New Zealand House of Representatives
Unsuccessful candidates in the 2008 New Zealand general election
21st-century New Zealand politicians
Candidates in the 2017 New Zealand general election
Candidates in the 2020 New Zealand general election